

Florence Hutchings (also Floy or Flora, August 23, 1864—September 26, 1881) was the daughter of James Mason Hutchings and his wife Elvira. She lived a short but colorful life.

Her life

She was born on August 23, 1864, and was the first non-Ahwahnechee born in Yosemite Valley.

Her birth was in the Hutchings' Upper Hotel, but she grew up in a log cabin built in 1865, on the north side of the Valley. She grew up within the sight and sound of Yosemite Falls.

She grew to fame due to her tomboy ways, and throughout her short life complained  that she had not been born a boy. She played with lizards instead of dolls and, when older, rolled her own cigarettes.

She was adventurous, defying the conventions of her time: she rode bareback, alone she camped and hiked, greeting Yosemite visitors in "knee-high boots, trousers, a flowing cape, and a wide-brimmed hat" in an exuberant "Welcome, welcome!"

She was quite interested in religion, gladly helping out as a caretaker of the then-new Yosemite Valley Chapel. She "swept, dusted, decorated the church with wildflowers, laid out hymn books, and rang the bell to announce services when a minister visited."

Florence died tragically when guiding a party to Glacier Point, on the Ledge Trail. According to one account a large boulder loosed and hit her. Her grave is in the Yosemite Cemetery, just east of Yosemite Falls. Her grave is "in the grove of noble oaks where Tissiac, Goddess of the Valley, keeps constant watch." It is marked "Aug. 23, 1864. Sept. 26, 1881. F. H."

John Muir's observations on her

Of her, John Muir observed "Your Squirrel [Florence Hutchings] is very happy. She is a rare creature."

He also noted

Legacy

Yosemite's Mount Florence  was named for her. John Muir was credited with saying of her, "Let us give the girl, for her own and her father's sake, some graceful mountain height, and let it be called 'Mount Florence'."

A fictional account of her life is in the coming-of-age novel Call Me Floy.

See also

 Carleton Watkins
 Charles Leander Weed
 Chief Tenaya
 Dean Potter
 Eadweard Muybridge
 Frederick Law Olmsted
 Galen Clark
 Mariposa War
 Yosemite National Park

References

External links and references

 Cowgirl Magazine of Florence Hutchings
 Yosemite Pioneer Cemetery on Florence Hutchings
 Growing up in Yosemite on Florence Hutchings
 FindaGrave on Florence Hutchings

Deaths in Yosemite National Park
Yosemite National Park
1864 births
1881 deaths